Michael Maar (born July 17, 1960, in Stuttgart) is a German literary scholar, germanist and author.

For his 1995 doctoral dissertation on Thomas Mann, titled Geister und Kunst, he was awarded the Johann Heinrich Merck Prize by the Deutsche Akademie für Sprache und Dichtung. He was himself elected a member of the academy in 2002. He was a Fellow of the Wissenschaftskolleg zu Berlin from 1997 to 1998, and Visiting Professor at Stanford University in 2002. From 2005 to 2006 he was a Fellow of the Carl Friedrich von Siemens Stiftung. In 2008, he became a member of the Bayerische Akademie der Schönen Künste.

His 2005 book The Two Lolitas, as well as two articles in the Frankfurter Allgemeine Zeitung and The Times Literary Supplement the previous year, argued that Vladimir Nabokov's 1955 novel Lolita was most likely based on an until-then little known 1916 short story by German author Heinz von Lichberg, also titled Lolita and featuring an identical theme. The discovery received strong attention by literary critics and the world press. Maar did not himself accuse Nabokov of plagiarism, but suggested it was a case of cryptomnesia, arguing that Nabokov and Lichberg lived in the same part of Berlin for several years in the 1920s and 1930s and that Lichberg's 1916 book (a collection of short stories) was easily available at the time.

His father is the author Paul Maar.

Selected bibliography

English
Bluebeard’s chamber; guilt and confession in Thomas Mann, translated by David Fernbach, London; New York, Verso, 2003. 
The Two Lolitas, translated by Perry Anderson, London, Verso, 2005.

German
Bild und Text: literarische Texte im Unterricht. Goethe-Institut, München, Ref. 42, Arbeitsstelle für Wiss. Didaktik. Hrsg. von Michael Maar u. Paul Maar. Lernhinweise von Jutta Weisz. 1988
Geister und Kunst. Neuigkeiten aus dem Zauberberg. 1995
Die Feuer- und die Wasserprobe. Essays zur Literatur. 1997
Die falsche Madeleine. Essays. 1999
Marcel Proust. Zwischen Belle Époque und Moderne (Herausgeber und Kommentar) 1999
Das Blaubart-Zimmer. Thomas Mann und die Schuld. 2000 (Üb. ins Englische: Bluebeard’s Chamber. Guilt and Confession in Thomas Mann, London 2003)
Warum Nabokov Harry Potter gemocht hätte. 2002,  
Die Glühbirne der Etrusker. Essays und Marginalien. 2003
Lolita und der deutsche Leutnant. Essay. 2005
Leoparden im Tempel. Zu Andersen, Borges, Canetti, Chesterton, Kafka, Lampedusa, Mann, Musil, Nabokov, Powell, Proust, Woolf. 2007
Solus Rex. Die schöne böse Welt des Vladimir Nabokov. 2007
Hilfe für die Hufflepuffs. Kleines Handbuch zu Harry Potter. 2008, 
Proust Pharao. 2009,

Awards
 Johann-Heinrich-Merck-Preis (1995)
 Ernst-Robert-Curtius-Preis (1995)
 Essay-Stipendium der Stiftung Niedersachsen (1998)
  (2000)
 Essay-Stipendium Baden-Württemberg (2001)
 Heinrich Mann Prize (2010)

References

External links 
 

German literary critics
Stanford University faculty
1960 births
Living people
German male non-fiction writers
Heinrich Mann Prize winners